Zoanthids (order Zoantharia also called Zoanthidea or Zoanthiniaria) are an order of cnidarians commonly found in coral reefs, the deep sea and many other marine environments around the world. These animals come in a variety of different colonizing formations and in numerous different colors. They can be found as individual polyps, attached by a fleshy stolon or a mat that can be created from small pieces of sediment, sand and rock. The term "zoanthid" refers to all animals within this order Zoantharia, and should not be confused with "Zoanthus", which is one genus within Zoantharia.

These are among the most commonly collected corals in reef aquaria, easily propagating and very durable in many water conditions.

Nomenclature controversy
The name of the order is controversial. Non-specialists often use the term Zoanthidea whereas most taxonomists use Zoantharia. The term Zoantharia in turn is used temporarily instead of Hexacorallia. However, major taxonomic papers published since 1899 by specialists (O. Carlgren and F. Pax have described more species than all other authors combined) use Zoantharia, and most recent specialists on the order continue to use the term Zoantharia.

Characteristics
Zoanthids can be distinguished from other colonial anthozoans and soft coral by their characteristic of incorporating sand and other small pieces of material into their tissue to help make their structure (except for the family Zoanthidae). A main characteristic of the order is that their tentacles are all marginal. Most species propagate asexually and the offspring of the original polyp remain connected to each other, by a stolonal network or coenosarc. Some species are solitary.

While the most well-known zoanthids are the zooxanthellate genera found in tropical and sub-tropical waters (primarily Zoanthus and Palythoa), many other species and genera exist, some still relatively unknown to science. Many zoanthids (in particular the genera Epizoanthus and Parazoanthus) are often found growing on other marine invertebrates.

Often in zooxanthellate genera such as Zoanthus and Palythoa there are a large number of different morphs of the same or similar species. Such zooxanthellate genera derive a large portion of their energy requirements from symbiotic dinoflagellates of the genus Symbiodinium (zooxanthellae), similar to many corals, anemones, and some other marine invertebrates.

Families and genera

The families and genera within the order Zoantharia (also known as Zoanthidea) are:
 Abyssoanthidae
 Abyssoanthus Reimer & Fujiwara in Reimer, Sinniger, Fujiwara, Hirano & Maruyama, 2007
Suborder Macrocnemina
 Epizoanthidae
 Epizoanthus Gray, 1867
 Paleozoanthus Carlgren, 1924
 Thoracactis Gravier, 1918
 Hydrozoanthidae
 Hydrozoanthus Sinniger, Reimer & Pawlowski, 2010
 Terrazoanthus Reimer & Fujii, 2010
 Microzoanthidae
 Microzoanthus Fujii & Reimer, 2011
 Nanozoanthidae
 Nanozoanthus Fujii & Reimer, 2013
 Parazoanthidae
Antipathozoanthus Sinniger, Reimer & Pawlowski, 2010
Bergia Duchassaing & Michelotti, 1860
Bullagummizoanthus Sinniger, Ocaña & Baco, 2013
Corallizoanthus Reimer in Reimer Nonaka Sinniger & Iwase, 2008
Hurlizoanthus Sinniger, Ocaña & Baco, 2013
Isozoanthus Carlgren, 1905
Kauluzoanthus Sinniger, Ocaña & Baco, 2013
Kulamanamana Sinniger, Ocaña & Baco, 2013
Mesozoanthus Sinniger & Haussermann, 2009
Parazoanthus Haddon & Shackleton, 1891
Savalia Nardo, 1814 (synonym: Gerardia)
Umimayanthus Montenegro, Sinniger & Reimer, 2015
Zibrowius Sinniger, Ocaña & Baco, 2013
Suborder Brachycnemina
 Neozoanthidae
 Neozoanthus
 Sphenopidae
 Palythoa Lamouroux, 1816
 Sphenopus Steenstrup, 1856
 Zoanthidae
 Acrozoanthus Saville-Kent, 1893
 Isaurus Gray, 1828
 Zoanthus Cuvier, 1800

Note: there are some zoanthid genera such as Neozoanthus or Paleaozoanthus for which there are currently only few data available, those zoanthids having never been found again since their original description.

Aquaria

Zoanthidae include many species popular in the fishkeeping world, among hobbyists and professionals. They are relatively easy to keep alive and healthy, and will often spread to cover rocks in their bright circles of color. They are known by some as carpet coral, button polyps, and "zoas" or "zoos."

Captive Propagation

Zooanthids and Palythoa are propagated in captivity by cutting the polyps apart using a scalpal or scissors then attaching to a surface with cyanoacrylate glue. Care must be taken when cutting zooanthids because if the palytoxin gets in the bloodstream a person will become very ill. Drying the polyps with paper towel then gluing them to a small base with gelled cyanoacrylate glue ensures they do not drift in the aquarium when reintroduced

Dangers
Some zoanthids contain the highly toxic substance palytoxin. Palytoxin is one of the most toxic organic substances in the world, but there is an ongoing debate over the concentration of this toxin in these animals. However, even in small quantities, the toxin can be fatal should it be ingested or enter the blood stream. If delivered immediately, it has been suggested that vasodilators can be injected into the ventricle of the heart to act as an antidote. A 2010 study found toxic zoanthids in three Washington, D.C. area aquarium stores.

Reports are varied and conflicting on the potential dangers of handling the animal in the aquarist hobby. General opinion and practical experience holds that in order for this toxin to be dangerous to humans, the average aquarist would need to ingest the zoanthid in sufficient quantities, or brush a recent cut over it, and average handling, propagation and aquarium maintenance is unlikely to pose any danger beyond a localized skin reaction.

Other sources state that palytoxin can be absorbed through intact skin, and the danger of acute poisoning from venomous zoanthids is quite real. According to a report an aquarist was poisoned through skin injuries on fingers by a species of Parazoanthus, but recovered after three days. His zoanthid was found to contain 2-3 milligrams of PTX per gram.

Palytoxin has also been known to damage the eyes of aquarists who attempt to propagate the coral by cutting it and being squirted in the eye. Temporary blindness and permanent blindness have been reported. It is always recommended to wear proper eye protection when cutting corals.

Research shows that in sublethal quantities, Palytoxin is a tumor promoter, and is being studied in relation to signaling pathways in skin cancer genesis.

Generally it is considered proper practice to always wear appropriate protective gloves when reaching into salt water tanks and handling sea invertebrates.

Diet
Zoanthids feed both by photosynthesis, aided by the zooxanthellae they contain, and by capturing plankton and particulate matter. Although photosynthesis aids in their nutrition, even species that do not actively capture plankton cannot live through photosynthesis alone. Zoanthids can eat meaty foods, such as lancefish, brine shrimp, krill, and bloodworms.

References

External links

 Maintaining Zoanthids Tips, Care, Photos
 Discussion About The Toxicity of Zoanthids
 Gallery of Zoanthid Pictures
 World's 2nd deadliest poison, in an aquarium store near you

 
Hexacorallia
Cnidarian orders